Fu Jiamo (傅家谟, July, 1935 – June 11, 2015) was an academician of the Chinese Academy of Sciences (CAS) and professor of environmental and architectural engineering in Shanghai University. He wrote about recycling electronic waste.

References 

1935 births
2015 deaths
Chemists from Shanghai
Engineers from Shanghai
Members of the Chinese Academy of Sciences
Engineering educators
Chinese technology writers
Writers from Shanghai